Warpaint is the second studio album by the American indie rock band Warpaint, released on January 17, 2014 on Rough Trade Records. Produced by Flood and the band itself, the album was preceded by the single, "Love Is to Die". It has been characterized as dream pop.

Composition
In an interview with NME in September 2011, drummer Stella Mozgawa affirmed that Warpaint planned to "experiment and write with one another" to develop the songs on Warpaint as their current lineup had never composed songs "from the ground up" together. Bassist Jenny Lee Lindberg elaborated on the composition of new material, explaining most songs were written by "just jam[ming] and free-flow[ing] onstage". Guitarist Theresa Wayman confirmed that the band intended to create a minimalist sound on Warpaint, revealing that the band developed songs at soundchecks, and experimented more with acoustic guitars and percussion instruments on the album. Lead vocalist Emily Kokal noted that R&B and rap music was an influence on Warpaint and stated that on the album there are "things that have drum machines and ambience, music that's more than standard rock." Kokal added that the album is largely keyboards-based, which contributed to the overall sound being "definitely different" from the band's previous album The Fool (2010).

Release
Warpaint was released in Germany, Ireland, Netherlands and Switzerland on January 17, 2014; January 20 in Denmark, France, Sweden and the United Kingdom; and January 21 in Spain and the United States on Rough Trade. It was released in Japan on January 22 on Hostess Entertainment, with two bonus tracks featured on the CD release. Warpaint was released on a number of formats, including CD, colored double LP and as a digital download. Autographed posters and stencils were issued free with the first 1,000 LP and CD pre-orders from the band's online store.

A snippet of the album's lead single, "Love Is to Die", was featured in an advertisement for Calvin Klein on September 25, 2013 and later as part of a teaser for an upcoming documentary of the same name about the recording of Warpaint. The single was released on October 28 with pre-ordered digital versions of the album. The song was also featured on a season 7 episode, also named "Love Is to Die", of HBO series True Blood, which aired on August 17, 2014.

In 2014, it was awarded a double silver certification from the Independent Music Companies Association, which indicated sales of at least 40,000 copies throughout Europe.

Tour
In support of the album, Warpaint commenced a 23-date, three-leg international tour. The first leg, a European tour, began on October 28, 2013 at O2 ABC in Glasgow, Scotland and concluded on November 16 at the Crossing Border Festival in The Hague, Netherlands. A five-date set of performances at Laneway Festival in Australia began on January 31, 2014 and concluded on February 8, with Warpaint performing in various cities including Brisbane, Melbourne, Adelaide and Fremantle. The third and final leg began on February 19 at the O2 Academy in Leeds, England and concluded on March 1 at Aula Magna in Lisbon, Portugal. During the tour preceding Warpaints release, the band debuted several of the album's songs, including "Keep It Healthy", "Hi" and "Love Is to Die".

Reception

Upon its release, Warpaint received generally positive reviews. At Metacritic, which assigns a normalized rating out of 100 to reviews from mainstream critics, the album received an average score of 74, based on 40 reviews, indicating "generally favorable reviews". Alternative Press reviewer Brian Shultz stated that "Warpaint still yields an enjoyable, haunting outpouring of whispered emotional damage and spatial exploration". Writing for Clash, Daisy Jones referred to the album as "devastatingly brooding as ever", noting that "Warpaint have always managed to make music to totally submerge yourself in, like an oil painting mixed with blood, and this album is no exception". Jazz Monroe of Drowned in Sound called the material "virtuosic and exquisite" while describing the lyrical content as "romantic but unglamorous … [and the band] take their time to reflect love's ambiguity". Monroe summarized: "While a gentler, more complex thing, [Warpaint] leans hard on atmosphere and collapses, elegantly".  The Quietus writer Mof Gimmers referred to Warpaint as "a record spun with a rich synthetic ambience, resulting in a curious mixture of the pleasant and uneasy" and said that the songs "exude an intense, intoxicated arousal, with lip-fattening blood rushes, grotty cinematic witching-hour horniness and David Lynchian daydream fucks" in his positive review. AllMusic writer Heather Phares wrote that there was a "undeniably darker cast" to the album's songs in contrast to the band's previous releases. Referring to Warpaint as "expansive and envelopin", Phares selected "Love Is to Die", "Teese" and "Feeling Alright" as highlights of the album. In her review for NME, Eve Barlow noted that "if The Fool presented them as ethereal hippies with musical nous, Warpaint drives them forward as masters of their talent", describing the material as having a "crisper, more direct sound."

In DIYs review of Warpaint, El Hunt stated that "The Fool was wonderfully muddied and submerged, while Warpaint zooms for the stratosphere", further praising Floods production on the album as well as referring to Warpaint's "subtle handle of tone" as "magical." Writing for FACT, John Cavert considered Warpaint as "richer in atmosphere, sharper [and] artistically decisive" than the band's debut album and drew comparisons between Warpaints material and Radioheads Kid A (2000), The Raincoats and Delta 5. In his review for The Guardian, Alexis Petridis was initially critical, saying that Warpaint had an "overall atmosphere so subdued it makes Love Is to Die sound like the Vengaboys' cover of 'Hot Hot Hot'". He later stated that "patience and time reveal that to be a false first impression, at least in part" and summarized that "there's something impressively brave about releasing an album that demands time and concentration … Warpaint slowly pulls you into its own, quietly captivating world". Chase Woodruff of Slant Magazine commended its "complex, operatic highs" and "subdued, ethereal sound" but concluded that "its experiments in minimalism and tranquility make for some awfully low lows".

Track listing

Personnel
All personnel credits adapted from Warpaints album notes.

Warpaint
Emily Kokal - Guitar, Vocals (2, 3, 5, 6-8, 11)
Jenny Lee Lindberg - Bass, Vocals (7, 11)
Stella Mozgawa - Drums
Theresa Wayman - Guitar, Keyboards, Vocals (2-4, 6-9, 12)

Technical personnel
John Catlin – mixing
Cecil – recording, mixing
Flood – production, recording, mixing
Nigel Godrich – mixing (3, 9)
Stephen Marcussen – mastering
Sam Petts-Davies – mixing assistant (3, 9)
Drew Smith – recording
Justin Smith – recording
Warpaint – production, recording, mixing

Design personnel
Chris Cunningham – photography, artwork
Ravi Dhar – additional photography
Mia Kirby – additional photography, artwork

Chart positions

Release history

References

External links

2014 albums
Warpaint (band) albums
Rough Trade Records albums
Albums produced by Flood (producer)